Peter Kevin Dineen (born November 19, 1960) is a Canadian former professional ice hockey defenceman who played 13 games in the National Hockey League (NHL) for the Los Angeles Kings and Detroit Red Wings between 1986 and 1989. The rest of his career, which lasted from 1980 to 1991, was spent in the American Hockey League. He is the second oldest of the Dineen brothers (Kevin and Gord), and son of Bill Dineen who all also played in the NHL. He has been a professional hockey scout for the Minnesota North Stars, Philadelphia Flyers, Florida Panthers, Boston Bruins, and the Columbus Blue Jackets. In 2018, he was hired as an assistant coach for the Adirondack Thunder in the ECHL.

Playing career
Dineen was drafted in the ninth round of the 1980 NHL Entry Draft by the Philadelphia Flyers after playing two seasons in the Ontario Major Junior Hockey League with the Kingston Canadians. He would go on to a brief NHL career, playing in 13 games for the Los Angeles Kings and Detroit Red Wings. He earned two assists in those 13 games.

Career statistics

Regular season and playoffs

References

External links
 
 Hockey Draft Central

1960 births
Living people
Adirondack Red Wings players
Binghamton Whalers players
Boston Bruins scouts
Canadian ice hockey defencemen
Columbus Blue Jackets scouts
Detroit Red Wings players
Florida Panthers scouts
Hershey Bears players
Ice hockey people from Ontario
Kingston Canadians players
Los Angeles Kings players
Maine Mariners players
Minnesota North Stars scouts
Moncton Alpines (AHL) players
Moncton Golden Flames players
New Haven Nighthawks players
Philadelphia Flyers draft picks
Philadelphia Flyers scouts
San Diego Gulls (IHL) players
Seattle Breakers players
Sportspeople from Kingston, Ontario